Jedburgh railway station served the town of Jedburgh, Scottish Borders, Scotland from 1856 to 1964 on the Jedburgh Railway.

History 
The station opened on 17 July 1856 by the Jedburgh Railway Company. To the east was a locomotive shed and to the north was a goods yard. To the northeast was the signal box. The station closed for passengers on 13 August 1948 and closed to goods on 10 August 1964. Nothing remains.

References

External links 

Disused railway stations in the Scottish Borders
Railway stations in Great Britain opened in 1856
Railway stations in Great Britain closed in 1948
1856 establishments in Scotland
1948 disestablishments in Scotland
Former North British Railway stations